Johnstown station is an Amtrak intercity rail station in Johnstown, Pennsylvania, United States. The station is north of downtown Johnstown across the Little Conemaugh River. It is served by the daily round trip of the Pennsylvanian.

History

The station building was designed by Kenneth MacKenzie Murchison for the Pennsylvania Railroad and built in 1916. Amtrak took over intercity passenger service in 1971. The cancellation of the Three Rivers in 2005 (leaving just the Pennsylvanian) marked the first time in Johnstown's railway history that the town was served by just a single daily passenger train.

In November 2021, Amtrak announced plans for a renovation of the station, expected to begin in October 2022. The work will include replacement of the existing island platform and headhouse with an accessible platform and headhouse with an elevator, filling of the existing baggage tunnel, and track work.

References

External links 

Johnstown Amtrak Station (USA Rail Guide -- Train Web)

Amtrak stations in Pennsylvania
Stations on the Pittsburgh Line
Railway stations in the United States opened in 1916
Buildings and structures in Johnstown, Pennsylvania
Amtrak